Bård Vegar Solhjell (born 22 December 1971) is a former Norwegian politician for the Socialist Left Party. He served as Minister of Education from 2007 to 2009, and as Minister of the Environment from 2012 to 2013, both in Stoltenberg's Second Cabinet. Starting in March 2018, he is the Secretary General of WWF Norway.

Biography 
Solhjell was born in Kristiansand, and grew up in Sunnfjord in Sogn and Fjordane, Western Norway.

Solhjell holds a master's degree in political science, with emphasis on Sociology, Comparative Politics, and History of ideas, at both the University of Oslo and the University of Bergen. He has worked as a teacher, and in the postal service.

Solhjell was elected to Parliament in 2009 for Akershus County. He was a member of the Standing Committee on Foreign Affairs and Defence, as well as the Parliamentary leader of the Socialist Left Party's group. He was one of two deputy leaders of the Socialist Left Party from 2007 to 2015, and a member of its central committee since 1999.

Solhjell was party secretary of the Socialist Left Party 2001–2005. He was the deputy leader of Socialist Youth League between 1992 and 1994, before becoming a political adviser for the Socialist Left Party's Parliamentary group and a state secretary at the Prime Minister's office.

Solhjell was appointed as minister on 18 October 2007, succeeding Øystein Djupedal. Djupedal's old department was split during the 2007 reshuffle, and Solhjell was the minister in charge of kindergartens and lower education up to, and including, the high school level until a new government reshuffle in 2009.

In 2011, Solhjell published a book (Solidaritet på ny, Samlaget 2011) about solidarity, visions, and direction for the Norwegian red-green Government and for his political party, the Socialist Left Party (SV). Between 2001 and 2005, Solhjell was a member of the Norwegian Broadcasting Council. From 1992 to 1993, he was a board member of the organization "No to the EU".

Bård Vegar Solhjell is married, with 3 children. He lives in Son, just outside Oslo. He enjoys music and literature, and coaches a children's football team.

Political appointments
2012–2013 Minister of the Environment
2009–2012 Member of Parliament for the Socialist Left Party
2007–2009 Minister of Education
2005–2007 State Secretary at the Prime Minister's office
2001–2005 Party Secretary for the Socialist Left Party
1999– Member of the Central Board in the Socialist Left Party

Work Experience
2000–2001 Political Adviser at the Parliamentary Committee of the Socialist Left Party
1994 Political Adviser of the Socialist Left Party

Education
2000– Master's degree in political science, with sociology, comparative politics, and history of ideas, from University of Oslo and University of Bergen

References

Bård Vegar Solhjell Entry at the Miljøverndepartementet (Ministry of the Environment) 
Bård Vegar Solhjell Entry at the Ministry of the Environment (Ministry of the Environment) 

1971 births
Living people
Socialist Left Party (Norway) politicians
Ministers of Climate and the Environment of Norway
Government ministers of Norway
21st-century Norwegian politicians
People from Sunnfjord
Ministers of Education of Norway
Politicians from Kristiansand